Aaghaata is a 1995 Indian Kannada language thriller - drama film directed by Suresh Heblikar and based on a novel by Dr. Ashok Pai. It was produced by Manasa Arts banner. Besides Heblikar, the film features Girish Karnad, Shruti and Srikanth in pivotal roles. The music was composed by Vijaya Bhaskar.

The film won actress Shruti her first Karnataka State Best Actress award for her performance.

Plot
Kannada psychodrama based on the true-life case studies of the Pai couple, practicing psychiatrists and the film's producers. Usha (Shruthi), daughter of a retired school teacher, turns down a marriage proposal from a progressive US-based engineer in favour of university colleague Vikas (Srikant). Vikas abandons Usha when his oppressive father demands a dowry she cannot pay. After psychiatric treatment, Usha joins a rural voluntary organisation where she falls for its leader, Francis (Suresh Heblikar). The demise of her second lover after local gossip takes on religious overtones causes a further psychological crisis. The psychiatrist in the film (Girish Karnad), representing the producers, offers a sociological critique of the events.

Cast
 Suresh Heblikar
 Girish Karnad
 Shruti
 Srikanth
 Ramakrishna
 G. V. Shivanand
 Radha Ramachandra
 Mallikarjuna

Soundtrack
All the songs are composed and scored by Vijaya Bhaskar.

References

External links 

1995 films
1990s Kannada-language films
Indian thriller drama films
Films scored by Vijaya Bhaskar
1990s thriller drama films
1995 drama films